Huracán Fútbol Club is a Puerto Rican football club from Caguas, who formerly played in the Puerto Rico Soccer League.

History
The team was originally established in 1991. With the formation of the Puerto Rico Soccer League they formed a team composed of Puerto Rican and international players, including Ángel Santiago and René Bezares.

In 2010, the club was renamed from Caguas Huracán Criollos Fútbol Club to Huracán Fútbol Club

Puerto Rico Soccer League
2008 Season
During their first season in the league the team will be coached by Daniel Ramos.

Huracán debuted on July 3, 2008, in a game against Sevilla FC, losing 1–0. In its second game, the team tied with Guaynabo Fluminense FC, with neither team scoring a goal. On July 19, 2008, Huracán lost its third game against Gigantes de Carolina. On July 28, 2008, the team  defeated Tornados de Humacao 3–2, gaining three points. José Delgado Santana scored the first two goals for Huracán on his team debut. On the fifth date of the tournament the team lost to River Plate Ponce. On August 10, 2008, Huracán lost to Academia Quintana. This marked the end of the league's first half, the teams would then compete against each other a second time. In the first two games of this stage, Huracán lost to Atléticos de San Juan and Sevilla FC. To close the regular season, the team won 1 and lost 4 games.
in December 2008 Pedro Armstrong started as head coach of the team.

2009 Season
Huracán lost their first game 5–1 to River Plate Ponce.
Huracán lost their next game with the same score 5–1 this time to Sevilla FC.  On August 23, 2009 the team will play Tornados de Humacao to determine who gets 8th place, the loser is last in the table. Huracán can draw and still maintain 8th.

Club hierarchy

Huracán  Ltd.

Chairman: Dr. José E. Berrios

Huracán  plc.

Vice President : Eduardo Berrios

Club treasure  : Marcos Berrios

Club Secretary : Vivian Duran

Achievements

Liga Mayor de Fútbol Nacional: 0
Runners-up (1): 2004

Campeonato Nacional de Fútbol de Puerto Rico: 0
Runners-up (1): 2005

Current squad

References

External links
 Official Club Website

Football clubs in Puerto Rico
Puerto Rico Soccer League teams
1991 establishments in Puerto Rico